University of Northwestern (UNW) is a private Christian university in Roseville, Minnesota.

History 
It was established in 1902 as Northwestern Bible and Missionary Training School by William Bell Riley, a pastor at First Baptist Church of Minneapolis. In 1951, the school began offering baccalaureate programs. Prior to July 1, 2013 the school was called Northwestern College. UNW also owns a chain of radio stations across the Midwest and Eastern United States, broadcasting listener-supported Christian music and teaching programs. Noted evangelist Billy Graham served as the school's second president from 1948 to 1952.

The school bought its current campus, the former Nazareth Hall Preparatory Seminary, from the Archdiocese of Saint Paul and Minneapolis in 1971 for 1.1 million dollars.

Academics
The University of Northwestern offers 65+ areas of study, 6 of which are through its FOCUS Adult Undergraduate Program. Northwestern offers five master's degrees.

The Graduate Studies program offers the following graduate degrees:
Master of Business Administration
Master of Organizational Leadership
Master of Divinity
Master of Theological Studies
Master of Ministry Leadership

The university was granted an exemption to Title IX in 2016 which allows it to legally discriminate against LGBT students for religious reasons.

Media

In February 1949, the Northwestern Schools opened KTIS AM and KTIS-FM in the Twin Cities area, the first in a series of radio stations across the Upper Midwest. 

Major markets served by Northwestern stations include the Twin Cities; Fargo; Duluth; Madison; Waterloo, Iowa; Des Moines; Rapid City; Sioux Falls; Hartford, Connecticut; Kansas City; and Omaha. Northwestern also operates the Faith Radio Network
The mission statement for the University of Northwestern – St. Paul's media ministry is: "to lead people to Christ and to nurture them in their spiritual growth through Christ Centered media".

University of Northwestern – St. Paul students operate a campus radio station, theMEL.fm, and a student television station. theMEL.fm is a station that broadcasts on KTIS-HD4 as well as a live Internet stream.

Music
Music ensembles at Northwestern include the Northwestern Choir, UNW Orchestra, Symphonic Band, Jazz Band, Con Brio Men's Chorus, Amata Women's Chorale, and numerous chamber ensembles. UNW Music degrees are accredited by the National Association of Schools of Music.

Athletics

The University of Northwestern – St. Paul's sponsors 20 varsity intercollegiate athletic sports, including football, women's volleyball, men's and women's soccer, men's and women's cross country, men's and women's golf, men's and women's basketball, baseball, softball, men's and women's indoor and outdoor track, men's and women's tennis, and men's and women's lacrosse. Northwestern is a member of the NCAA Division III, a Division I member of the National Christian College Athletic Association, and is one of nine full-time members of the Upper Midwest Athletic Conference (UMAC). Prior to its NCAA Division III membership, which began on a full-time basis prior to the 2008-2009 academic year, the Eagles were a member of the National Association of Intercollegiate Athletics (NAIA).

Since becoming a Division III member in 2008, the schools teams have earned bids to 32 NCAA Tournaments. In 2015 two University of Northwestern – St. Paul teams advanced to NCAA Sweet 16 appearances in men's basketball and women's volleyball.  The Eagles volleyball team has advanced to ten of the last eleven NCAA Tournaments, 2 Sweet 16's (2015 & 2017), a Final Four (2016), and was a recipient of the NCAA's Sportsmanship Award for all divisions in 2009. The men's basketball team has also advanced to nine of the last ten NCAA national tournaments.  The University of Northwestern – St. Paul became the first college football team in modern history to play two games on the same day. On October 8, 2005, under head coach Kirk Talley, the Eagles defeated Trinity Bible College 59–0 in a 12 noon kickoff before defeating Macalester College 6.5 miles down Snelling Avenue at 7 p.m. that night, 47–14. The UNW football team has won two NCCAA Victory Bowls in 2000 and 2008.
The University of Northwestern – St. Paul men's basketball team won the 2010 NCCAA Division I Men's Basketball National Tournament, defeating King College (Tennessee - NCAA Division II), for its first ever Division I championship by a score of 58–54.
They followed that up with another championship in 2021 defeating Ottawa College 82-75 in the championship game. 
The baseball team had a historic season in 2021 making winning their first UMAC regular season and post season tournament since 1996. They hosted the NCAA regional where the eventually lost 3-2 in the championship game against Johns Hopkins.

University of Northwestern – St. Paul athletic and recreation facilities  consist of the Ericksen Center (1996) (volleyball, men's and women's basketball) and the Reynolds Field complex (2014), which houses the Johnson Tennis Complex and 100 percent artificially turfed fields for baseball, softball, football, soccer and lacrosse. The outdoor facility also offers a running and jumping pit for track and field participants, a stadium, and four locker rooms.

In addition to the Eagles' success on the court and field of play, the University of Northwestern – St. Paul's coaching staff has an average tenure of over 10 years, with five head coaches logging at least 15 years at UNW.

Associations
University of Northwestern – St. Paul is a member of the Council for Christian Colleges and Universities.

The FOCUS Adult Undergraduate program is a member of the Twin Cities Adult Education Alliance.

The Music Department is fully accredited by the National Association of Schools of Music.

Notable alumni
 Benjamin Fernandes (B.A.'14) - award-winning speaker, entrepreneur and former national television presenter.
 Jonathan Papik (B.A. '04) - current Justice of the Nebraska Supreme Court and judicial law clerk to Neil Gorsuch.
 Roger Youderian ('50) - American evangelical Christian missionary to Ecuador martyred in 1956.
 Dallas Jenkins - a film and television director, writer and film producer.
 Sherman Augustus - an American actor. Augustus also played professional football with the San Diego Chargers and Minnesota Vikings.
 Brian Lohse - an attorney and politician. A member of the Republican Party, he was elected to the Iowa House of Representatives in 2018.
 Elmer L. Towns (B.A. '54) - American Christian academic, pastor and writer who co-founded Liberty University.

See also

 List of colleges and universities in Minnesota
 Higher education in Minnesota

References

External links
 

 
1902 establishments in Minnesota
Council for Christian Colleges and Universities
Educational institutions established in 1902
Evangelicalism in Minnesota
Nondenominational Christian universities and colleges
Universisty of Northwestern St. Paul
Buildings and structures in Roseville, Minnesota
University of Northwestern St. Paul
Universities and colleges in Ramsey County, Minnesota